Cornelia "Nellie" Cole Fairbanks (January 14, 1852 – October 24, 1913) was the wife of Charles W. Fairbanks, the 26th vice president of the United States. During her husband's tenure she held the unofficial position of the second lady of the United States from 1905 to 1909. She was at the forefront of the women's suffrage movement and considered a pathfinder to politics for American women in the 20th and 21st centuries.

Early life and education, marriage and family
She was born in 1852 in Marysville, Ohio, the daughter of Ohio State Senator Philander Cole and Dorothy Witter. She attended the Ohio Wesleyan Female College, where she graduated with an A.B. in 1872.

In 1874 she married Charles Fairbanks, whom she had met at Ohio Wesleyan while working for the school paper. They had four sons and one daughter: Robert Fairbanks (who attended Yale),
Richard M. Fairbanks (who attended Yale and served as a captain in World War I),
Adelaide Fairbanks (who married Horace Allen, a doctor), Warren Charles Fairbanks, and
Frederick Cole Fairbanks.

Cornelia and Charles moved to Indiana where he began practicing law, and she read with him and assisted in his practice, eventually encouraging him to enter politics.

Activities
She was one of the founders of the all-women's Fortnightly Literary Club in Indianapolis, serving as its first president between 1885 and 1888. She also served on the State Board of Charities during this period.

With her husband serving as a U.S. Senator beginning in 1897, the couple came to Washington, D.C. 
In 1899 she hosted a trip for the British and American Joint High Commission to Alaska. Fairbanks, Alaska was named in honor of her husband shortly thereafter.

Cornelia was elected President General of the National Society of the Daughters of the American Revolution in 1901, and she served two terms in that capacity. During her tenure she helped raise funds to construct the society's Memorial Continental Hall in Washington. In 1907 her chapter of DAR was organized, with 28 charter members. She was also active with the George Junior Republic movement.

After her husband left office, they traveled the world in 1910, including an appearance in King Edward VII's court. Her attire from this event is housed at the Smithsonian Institution.

Fairbanks was a champion of Protestant Christianity, and supported missionary work.

Fairbanks died of pneumonia in 1913. She was survived by her children, husband, and mother. She is buried alongside her husband, who would die in 1918, in Crown Hill Cemetery in Indianapolis, Indiana.

Legacy
Cornelia Cole Fairbanks was considered a powerful progressive operative behind the political scenes, and helped pave the way for women leaders in the United States. She was considered the equivalent of the female President of the United States due to her leadership role with the Daughters of the American Revolution, and helped construct the second Women's Club in the United States in Indianapolis through her service on the national board of the General Federation of Women's Clubs. She was considered feminine, yet a suffragist and proponent of women's rights. Historically she is remembered as a pathfinder to politics for American women in the 20th and 21st centuries. She was one of the best known women in the United States during her time, and considered as clever a politician as her husband.

In her husband's will, he left funds for the Cornelia Cole Fairbanks Trust Fund, which helped create the Cornelia Cole Fairbanks Memorial Home, an alcohol addiction treatment center in Indianapolis.

References

External links

 Cornelia Cole Fairbanks Chapter DAR
 About Cornelia Cole Fairbanks

|-

1852 births
1913 deaths
Burials at Crown Hill Cemetery
Ohio Wesleyan Female College alumni
People from Marysville, Ohio
Second ladies of the United States
American suffragists
Daughters of the American Revolution people
Activists from Ohio